This is a list of the Australian species of the family Bucculatricidae. It also acts as an index to the species articles and forms part of the full List of moths of Australia.

Bucculatrix acrogramma Meyrick, 1919
Bucculatrix asphyctella Meyrick, 1880
Bucculatrix eucalypti Meyrick, 1880
Bucculatrix gossypii Turner, 1926
Bucculatrix ivella Busck, 1900
Bucculatrix lassella Meyrick, 1880
Bucculatrix mesoporphyra (Turner, 1933)
Bucculatrix parthenica Bradley, 1990
Bucculatrix perfixa Meyrick, 1915
Bucculatrix ptochastis Meyrick, 1893
Bucculatrix ulocarena Turner, 1923
Bucculatrix xenaula Meyrick, 1893
Cryphioxena notosema Meyrick, 1922
Ogmograptis scribula Meyrick, 1935

External links 
Bucculatricidae at Australian Faunal Directory

Australia